Steel Arena is a 1973 American sports drama film written and directed by Mark L. Lester, in his feature film directorial debut

Plot

Home media
The film was released on Blu-ray on December 31, 2018.

See also
List of American films of 1973

References

External links

1973 films
1973 directorial debut films
1973 drama films
1970s English-language films
American auto racing films
American drama films
Films directed by Mark L. Lester
1970s American films